This Is the Sharp is the debut studio album by Australian pop-rock band The Sharp. It was released in September 1993 and peaked at number 13 on the ARIA Charts.

At the ARIA Music Awards of 1994, the album was nominated for ARIA Award for Breakthrough Artist – Album.

Track listing
 "Scratch My Back"	
 "Talking Shy"	
 "Train of Thought"	
 "Don't Waste My Time"	
 "Kiss Me Again"	
 "Yeah I Want You"	
 "Caught in the Deep"	
 "Closer"	
 "Waiting for the Next Thing to Happen"	
 "Dark Sunglasses"
 "Love Kiss"	
 "You Don't Know Me"	
 "Can I Love"

Charts

Release history

References

1993 debut albums
Warner Music Australasia albums
The Sharp albums